Al-Rustaq Sports Football Club (Arabic: نادي الرستاق الرياضي لكرة القدم) is an Omani sports club based in Rustaq, Oman. In 2016, the club was promoted to the first tier for the first time in its history. For the 2022–23 season, they compete in the Oman Professional League.

Honours

League 
Oman First Division League (Tier 2)
Winners (1): 2015–16

Players

First team squad
Al-Rustaq Club players squad for the 2022–23 season.

References

External links
Al-Rustaq's Profile at Soccerway.com
Al-Rustaq on Twitter
Al-Rustaq on Instagram

Football clubs in Oman
Oman Professional League
Association football clubs established in 1986